Joseph G. Bernstein (aka Joe Burten) was a professional football player.  He played in the National Football League with the Rock Island Independents and the New York Brickley Giants. Brickley's New York Giants are not related to the modern-day New York Giants.

Bernstein played college football at Louisiana State University. There he lettered three times in 1915, 1916 and 1919.

Notes

1893 births
1967 deaths
Players of American football from New York (state)
New York Brickley Giants players
Rock Island Independents players
LSU Tigers football players
Tulsa Golden Hurricane football players